The 1st International 2000 Guineas was a motor race, for Formula One cars, held on Monday 11 June 1962 (the Whit Monday bank holiday in the UK) at Mallory Park, Leicestershire. The meeting was organised by the Nottingham Sports Car Club and live coverage was featured in the BBC's Bank Holiday Grandstand.

The race was run over 75 laps of the circuit, and was won by British driver John Surtees in a Lola Mk4.

This race represented the Formula One debut of Mike Parkes.

Another Formula One race was held on the same day, the 1962 Crystal Palace Trophy, at Crystal Palace Circuit.

Results

Team Lotus also originally entered a car and an unnamed driver with No.14, but this entry was withdrawn.

References

Results at Silhouet.com 

International 2000 Guineas